Vermiform Records was an American independent record label that specialized in releasing punk rock music from 1990 until 2002. Vermiform released 58 albums and relocated many times,
being headquartered in New York, New Jersey, Virginia, Rhode Island and California at different times. The label was run by Sam McPheeters, the singer from Born Against.

Roster

Amps For Christ
Bastard Noise
Born Against
Bullet In The Head
Citizens Arrest
Econochrist
Fast Forward
The Great Unraveling
Hail Mary
Heroin
Landed
Life's Blood
Manacled
Man Is The Bastard
Men's Recovery Project
Moss Icon
Mr. Brinkman
Pleasurehorse
Rah Bras
Rorschach
Screeching Weasel
Towel
Witchypoo
Worst Case Scenario
(Young) Pioneers

Releases

Note that there is no release with the catalog number of 54. This is because originally that catalog number was going to belong to a Man Is The Bastard live album, however the release was scrapped last minute.

See also
 List of record labels

References

External links
Vermiform Records on SamMcPheeters.com

American record labels
Punk record labels